Davide Drei (born 22 January 1965 in Forlì) is an Italian politician.

He is a member of the Democratic Party and he was elected Mayor of Forlì on 25 May 2014 and took office on 28 May. His term as mayor ended on 11 June 2019.

Drei served as President of the Province of Forlì-Cesena from 2014 to 2018.

See also
2014 Italian local elections
List of mayors of Forlì

References

External links
 
 

1965 births
Living people
Mayors of Forlì
Democratic Party (Italy) politicians
Presidents of the Province of Forlì-Cesena